Streptomyces microflavus is a bacterium species from the genus of Streptomyces which has been isolated from soil. Streptomyces microflavus produces nemadectin, fattiviracin A1, milbemycin and deoxyuridines. Streptomyces microflavus also produces the ionophore valinomycin. Streptomyces microflavus is also known to cause potato common scab disease in Korea.

See also 
 List of Streptomyces species

References

Further reading

External links
Type strain of Streptomyces microflavus at BacDive -  the Bacterial Diversity Metadatabase	

microflavus
Bacteria described in 1948